Víctor Cañas   is a Costa Rican architect, founder of Cañas Arquitectos (formerly known as Cañas Collado Consultores) in 1972, a former professor at the University of Costa Rica. He is also a former diplomat.

Víctor Cañas, the world of architecture is a bridge that links the everyday to the everlasting, a world where creations are simply an artifice of the daily and vital. Structured within his strong desire to harmonize space and time, Arq. Cañas is the creator of spaces that transcend walls; the frame and the barriers of typical construction. His buildings and homes reveal situations and elements in a world of three-dimensional schemes that can only be experienced while mingling in his artistic achievements.

If the architect plays a double role in society as both the communicator and builder of environments then Mr. Cañas is saying and creating something truly unique with shape and form, going far beyond the basic spaces that fulfill the needs of home or office. As he explains it, "Architecture is mainly an organized space that gives shelter to a harmonious entity." Born in San José, Mr. Cañas completed both his undergraduate and graduate work abroad, acquiring a vast knowledge in the fields of design, architecture and urban planning. His observations as a student, first in Mexico and later in the United Kingdom, sculpted his knowledge in all three areas.

He founded his office at time when the Costa Rican society had little or no exposure and understanding about how fabulous design is. Over the years, more people have been exposed to and educated in good design, thus it has become more valued and now Cañas Architects is recognized as one of Latinamerica’s architectural offices with a longer and most committed trajectory. 

Adding to his impressive resume, Mr. Cañas later returned to the United Kingdom to serve as Consul of the Costa Rican Embassy of London. He has traveled extensively as a visiting professor and lecturer at universities in Panama, Venezuela, Japan, United States, among other countries. In 1989 he joined University of Costa Rica as a professor of architectural design.

As an architect, his diverse creations have received national and international acclaim, including the gold medal at the 2002 Central American and Caribbean Architecture Triennial, held in Panama; the award for best steel construction at the Architecture Biennial in San Jose in 2002; and the grand prize in design at the Architecture and Urbanism Biennial in both 1998 and 2004, also held in San José.  He also holds the record of wins of the Gran Premio (Main Prize) at the Costa Rican Architectural Biennale -three times. Victor Cañas is the first Honorary member of the American Institute of Architects ( Hon.FAIA ) in the category of Architectural Design in Central America and the only one whose postulation was made on the sole bases of his designs and remains so to this date.

In his works, Mr. Cañas believes that the landscapes, as well as the internal structures of a home, must be combined to give shape to design. From office spaces to leisure homes, his remarkable constructions reflect this desire, creating in the process a world in which textures, lines and forms blur and in which architecture becomes, as he puts it. “practical, yet organized, poetry.”

External links
Official site

Year of birth missing (living people)
Living people
People from San José, Costa Rica
Costa Rican architects
Academic staff of the University of Costa Rica
Costa Rican diplomats